Phaeosaces apocrypta is a species of moth in the family Depressariidae. It was first described by Edward Meyrick in 1885. This species is endemic to New Zealand.

References

Depressariidae
Moths of New Zealand
Endemic fauna of New Zealand
Moths described in 1885
Taxa named by Edward Meyrick
Endemic moths of New Zealand